Dante Zacarías Morán Correa (born 22 February 1996) is an Argentine professional footballer who plays as a midfielder for Richmond Kickers in USL League One.

Club career
Morán started his career in the system of River Plate, joining in 2007. He first appeared in the senior team in April 2016 as an unused substitute for an Primera División match with Vélez Sarsfield. Morán made his professional debut on 25 May 2017 in a Copa Libertadores group stage victory over Independiente Medellín. In January 2018, after no further appearances for River, Morán completed a loan move to San Martín. He wouldn't feature for the Primera División team's senior side; though did appear on the bench once, for a Copa Argentina match with Villa Dálmine on 20 March 2019.

Upon returning to his parent club, Morán was immediately loaned out to Primera B Nacional's Chacarita Juniors in July 2019. His debut arrived on 24 August in a 2–1 defeat away to Gimnasia y Esgrima, which he played the full duration of. He appeared seven times in total for El Tricolor. He returned to River Plate in early 2020, though wouldn't appear competitively for them before terminating his contract on 10 February 2021. 

On 24 February, Morán joined USL League One side Richmond Kickers. After two seasons in which he had 56 appearances, Morán signed a multi-year contract to remain with the club on 17 January 2023.

International career
In 2013, Morán represented Argentina at U17 level and won five caps. He was selected in squads for the 2013 South American Under-17 Football Championship and 2013 FIFA U-17 World Cup. He featured four times at the U17 Championship which Argentina won, before making a sole appearance at the U17 World Cup in the United Arab Emirates against Austria.

Career statistics
.

Honours
Argentina U17
South American Under-17 Football Championship: 2013

References

External links

1996 births
Living people
Sportspeople from San Juan Province, Argentina
Argentine footballers
Argentina youth international footballers
Association football midfielders
Argentine expatriate footballers
Expatriate soccer players in the United States
Argentine expatriate sportspeople in the United States
Primera Nacional players
Club Atlético River Plate footballers
San Martín de San Juan footballers
Chacarita Juniors footballers
Richmond Kickers players